Dragan Jovanović may refer to:
Dragan Jovanović (actor) (born 1965), Serbian actor
Dragan Jovanović (footballer) (1903–1936), Serbian footballer
Dragan Jovanović (water polo), Serbian water polo goalkeeper and coach
Dragan Jovanović (kickboxer) (born 1977), Serbian kickboxer
Dragan Jovanović (Serbian politician, born 1946), Serbian politician
Dragan Jovanović (Serbian politician, born 1957), Serbian politician
Dragan Jovanović (Serbian politician, born 1960), Serbian politician
Dragan Jovanović (Serbian politician, born 1972), Serbian politician
Dragan Jovanović (Yugoslav politician), Serbian politician and finance minister of Yugoslavia